The following is a list of assassinations by firearm detailing the firearms used in the killings of politicians and key social and cultural figures.

References

Firearm
Firearms